Tularosa Municipal Schools is a public school district in Otero County, New Mexico, United States.

In addition to Tularosa its boundary includes Bent and Mescalero.

Schools
The Tularosa Municipal Schools School District has two elementary schools, one middle school and one high school.

Elementary schools
Tularosa Elementary School
Tularosa Inter Elementary School

Middle schools
Tullarosa Middle School

High schools
Tularosa High School

References

External links

School District Map - Otero County Government

School districts in New Mexico
Education in Otero County, New Mexico